Imran Bisthamin is a rugby union footballer in Sri Lanka who played for Sri Lanka, and Kandy Sports Club. He is a product of St. Anthony's College, Kandy, where he captained the college rugby team.

Bistamin played at Number 8 third-row-forward. Bisthamin represented the country at the Asian Rugby tournament in 2007.

Injury
On November 22, 2008, Bisthamin faced career-threatening injuries to the head and spinal cord when he fell from an upper floor of a restaurant at the George R de Silva Shopping Complex in Kandy. He was unconscious and rushed to the Kandy General Hospital and treated in the intensive-care unit for Brain haemorrhage. He regained consciousness after three weeks.

Controversy
On 2008, the exclusion of Bistamin from the Sri Lanka National Rugby Team ahead of Asian Five Nation Rugby Championship in Taiwan created a controversy with the second set of selectors led by Rohan Abeykoon protesting against the nepotistic move by Minister of Sports at that time, Gamini Lokuge.

See also
Sri Lanka national rugby union team
Kandy Sports Club
St. Anthony's College, Kandy

References

Living people
Alumni of St. Anthony's College, Kandy
Sri Lankan rugby union players
Sri Lankan Muslims
1984 births
Rugby union players from Kandy
Rugby union number eights